List of awards and nominations received by Marc Anthony. Marc Anthony is an American musician, singer-songwriter, actor and producer. Anthony is the top selling tropical salsa music artist of all time. The three-time Grammy and seven-time Latin Grammy-winner has sold more than 30 million albums worldwide. He is best known for his Latin salsa numbers and ballads.

Grammy Awards

|-
|  || Todo a Su Tiempo || Best Tropical Latin Album || 
|-
|  || Contra La Corriente || Best Tropical Latin Album || 
|-
| || "I Need To Know"  || Best Male Pop Vocal Performance || 
|-
| || "You Sang to Me"  || Best Male Pop Vocal Performance || 
|-
| || Libre || Best Salsa Album || 
|-
| || Amar Sin Mentiras  || Best Latin Pop Album || 
|-
| || Valió la Pena  || Best Salsa/Merengue Album || 
|-
| || 3.0  || Best Tropical Latin Album || 
|-
| || Opus  || Best Tropical Latin Album || 
|-
| || Pa'llá Voy  || Best Tropical Latin Album ||

Latin Grammy Awards

|-
|rowspan="5"| 2000 ||rowspan="3"| "Dímelo" || Latin Grammy Award for Record of the Year || 
|-
| Latin Grammy Award for Song of the Year || 
|-
| Latin Grammy Award for Best Pop Vocal Performance, Male || 
|-
|rowspan="2"| "No Me Ames" (featuring Jennifer Lopez)|| Latin Grammy Award for Best Pop Vocal Performance, Duo or Group || 
|-
| Latin Grammy Award for Best Music Video || 
|-
| 2002 || Libre  || Latin Grammy Award for Best Salsa Album || 
|-
|rowspan="3"| 2005 || Amar Sin Mentiras  || Latin Grammy Award for Best Pop Vocal Album, Male || 
|-
| Valió La Pena  || Latin Grammy Award for Best Salsa Album || 
|-
| "Valió La Pena"  || Latin Grammy Award for Best Tropical Song || 
|-
| 2008 || El Cantante  || Latin Grammy Award for Best Salsa Album || 
|-
| 2010 || Iconos  || Latin Grammy Award for Best Pop Vocal Album, Male || 
|-
|2013 || "Vivir Mi Vida"  || Latin Grammy Award for Record of the Year || 
|-
|rowspan="4"| 2014 || "Cambio de Piel"  || Latin Grammy Award for Record of the Year || 
|-
| "Cuando Nos Volvamos a Encontrar" (with Carlos Vives)  || Latin Grammy Award for Record of the Year || 
|-
|rowspan="2"| 3.0  || Latin Grammy Award for Album of the Year || 
|-
| Latin Grammy Award for Best Salsa Album || 
|-
|2016 || Marc Anthony  || Person of the Year || 
|-
|rowspan="2"| 2021 || "Un Amor Eterno (Versión Balada)" || Latin Grammy Award for Record of the Year || 
|-
| "Un Amor Eterno" || Latin Grammy Award for Best Short Form Music Video || 
|-
|rowspan="3"| 2022
|rowspan="3"| Pa'llá Voy
| Latin Grammy Award for Record of the Year || 
|-
| Latin Grammy Award for Album of the Year || 
|-
| Latin Grammy Award for Best Salsa Album || 
|-

American Music Awards

|-
| 2001 || Marc Anthony || Favorite Latin Artist || 
|-
| 2003 || Marc Anthony || Favorite Latin Artist || 
|-
| 2004 || Marc Anthony || Favorite Latin Artist || 
|-
| 2013 || Marc Anthony || Favorite Latin Artist || 
|-
| 2014 || Marc Anthony || Favorite Latin Artist || 
|-

Billboard Latin Music Awards

|-
|1994|| Marc Anthony || Tropical/Salsa New Artist of the Year || 
|-
|rowspan="2"| 1996 || "Todo a Su Tiempo" || Tropical/Salsa Album of the Year, Male || 
|-
| "Te Conozco Bien" || Tropical/Salsa Hot Latin Track of the Year || 
|-
|rowspan="2"| 1998 || "Contra La Corriente" || Tropical/Salsa Album of the Year, Male || 
|-
| "Y Hubo Alguien" || Tropical/Salsa Hot Latin Track of the Year || 
|-
|rowspan="3"|2000 ||rowspan="3"|"No Me Ames"  (featuring Jennifer Lopez) || Tropical/Salsa Track of the Year || 
|-
| Hot Latin Track of the Year || 
|-
| Hot Latin Track of the Year Vocal Duo || 
|-
|rowspan="1"|2001 ||"Desde Un Principio: From The Beginning" || Latin Greatest Hits Album of the Year || 
|-
|rowspan="2"|2002 || Marc Anthony || Top Latin albums artist of the year || 
|-
| "Libre" || Tropical/salsa album of the year, male || 
|-
|2003 ||"Viviendo" || Tropical/Salsa Airplay Track of the Year, Male || 
|-
|2005 || Marc Anthony || Telemundo Star Award || 
|-
|rowspan="2"|2006 ||"Tu Amor Me Hace Bien" || Tropical Airplay Song of the Year - Male|| 
|-
|  Marc Anthony, Chayanne, and Alejandro Fernández || Latin Tour of the Year|| 
|-
|rowspan="2"|2007 ||"Que Precio Tiene el Cielo" || Tropical Airplay Song of the Year - Male|| 
|-
| "Sigo Siendo Yo (Grandes Exitos)" || Latin Greatest Hits Album of the Year|| 
|-
|rowspan="2"|2008 ||"El Cantante" || Tropical Album of the Year - Male|| 
|-
| "Mi Gente" || Tropical Airplay Song of the Year|| 
|-
|2012 || Marc Anthony || Hall of Fame || 
|-
|rowspan="13"|2014 ||rowspan="4"| Marc Anthony || Artist of the Year|| 
|-
| Tour of the Year|| 
|-
| Tropical Songs Artist of the Year, Solo || 
|-
| Top Latin Albums Artist of the Year, Male || 
|-
|rowspan="6"| "Vivir Mi Vida" || Hot Latin Song of the Year || 
|-
| Airplay Song of the Year || 
|-
| Digital Song of the Year || 
|-
| Streaming Song of the Year || 
|-
| Latin Pop Song of the Year || 
|-
| Tropical Song of the Year || 
|-
|rowspan="2"| "3.0" || Top Latin Album of the Year || 
|-
| Tropical Album of the Year || 
|-

Lo Nuestro Awards

|-
| 1994 || "Marc Anthony" || Tropical - New Artist of the Year || 
|-
| 1996 || "Marc Anthony"  || Tropical - Best Male Artist || 
|-
|rowspan="2"|1997 || "Todo a su Tiempo"  || Tropical - Album of the Year || 
|-
| "Marc Anthony" || Tropical - Masculine Artist || 
|-
|1998 || "Y Hubo Alguien" || Tropical - Song of the Year || 
|-
|rowspan="2"|2001 ||rowspan="2"| "Marc Anthony" || Pop - Best Male Artist || 
|-
| Tropical - Best Male Artist || 
|-
|rowspan="4"|2003 ||rowspan="3"| "Marc Anthony" || Tropical - Best Male Artist || 
|-
| Best Salsa Performance || 
|-
| Popular Tropical Artist || 
|-
|"Viviendo" || Tropical Song of the Year || 
|-
|rowspan="3"|2004 ||rowspan="2"| "Marc Anthony" || Tropical - Best Male Artist || 
|-
| Best Salsa Performance || 
|-
|"Barco a la Deriva" || Tropical Song of the Year || 
|-
|rowspan="5"|2005 || "Valió la Pena" || Tropical - Album of the Year || 
|-
|rowspan="2"|"Marc Anthony" || Tropical - Male Artist of the Year || 
|-
| Tropical Salsa Artist of the Year || 
|-
|rowspan="2"|"Ahora Quién" || Tropical - Song of the Year || 
|-
| Video of the Year || 
|-
|rowspan="4"|2007 || "Sigo Siendo Yo (Grandes Exitos)" || Tropical - Album of the Year || 
|-
|"Tu Amor Me Hace Bien" || Tropical - Song of the Year || 
|-
|rowspan="2"|"Marc Anthony" || Salsa Artist of the Year || 
|-
| Tropical - Male Artist of the Year || 
|-
|rowspan="2"|2008 ||rowspan="2"| "Marc Anthony ||Tropical - Male Artist of the Year || 
|-
| Salsa Artist of the Year || 
|-
|rowspan="2"|2009 ||rowspan="2"| "Marc Anthony" || Tropical - Male Artist of the Year || 
|-
| Salsa Artist of the Year || 
|-
|2010 || "Recuérdame (featuring La Quinta Estación)|| Video of the Year || 
|-
|rowspan="6"|2014 || "3.0" || Tropical - Album of the Year || 
|-
|rowspan="2"|"Marc Anthony" || Excellence Award|| 
|-
| Salsa Artist of the Year || 
|-
|"Vivir Mi Vida" || Tropical - Song of the Year || 
|-
|rowspan="2"|"Por Que Les Mientes (Tito El Bambino)" || Collaboration of the Year || 
|-
| Tropical - Song of the Year ||

Ride of Fame

|-
| 2011 || Marc Anthony || Ride of Fame ||

References

Awards
Lists of awards received by American musician